The Georgetown Hoyas women's basketball team is women's basketball program in the NCAA Division I Big East Conference. The team was first formed in 1970, and joined the Big East in 1983. They play their home games on campus at McDonough Gymnasium.

The women's teams have been invited to the NCAA tournament four times, reaching the Sweet Sixteen in 1993 and 2011, and the second round in 2010 and 2012. They have been invited to the Women's National Invitation Tournament, five times, progressing furthest in 2009 by reaching the fourth round. Former player Rebekkah Brunson, now with the WNBA's Minnesota Lynx, is the team's all-time leading rebounder, while Sugar Rodgers, now with the WNBA's New York Liberty, is the all-time leader in points, steals, and 3-point field goals.

Year by year results
 
Conference tournament winners noted with # Source

NCAA tournament results

Players

Recruiting
Four class of 2012 players have made verbal commitments to Georgetown:
Katie McCormick
Logan Battle
Dominique Vitalis
Omowumi Rafiu

2010 Paradise Jam

Georgetown traveled to St. Thomas to participate in the Paradise Jam tournament held over the extended Thanksgiving weekend. On Thanksgiving, Georgetown beat Georgia Tech 67–58. The next day, 12th ranked (AP) Georgetown lost to unranked Missouri 54–45.

The final game matched up Georgetown, with a 1–1 record, against Tennessee, who were ranked 4th in the AP rankings, and had won their first two game in St. Thomas. Georgetown's Sugar Rogers, who has not played particularly well in the first two game of the tournament, had 28 points to help lead her team to an upset victory over Tennessee. The Hoyas opened up with an 11–4 run and never trailed. Tennessee out rebounded Georgetown 42–24, but committed 29 turnovers. Both teams shot about 40% from the field, but the Hoyas had an advantage beyond the arc, hitting 10 of their 18 three point attempts, while the Volunteers hit only three of 18 attempts. The two team ended with 2–1 records, but with the head-to-head tie breaker, Georgetown was awarded the Championship of the Paradise Jam, Island Division.

See also
Georgetown Hoyas men's basketball

References

External links
 

 
1970 establishments in Washington, D.C.
Basketball teams established in 1970